Dwight D. Eisenhower Highway (Maryland) can refer to:

Interstate 70 from Pennsylvania state line to Interstate 270
Interstate 270 from Interstate 495 to Interstate 70

Interstate 70